Voices in Shadows is the first studio album by Christian alternative rock band the Choir (known as "Youth Choir" at this point), released in 1985.

Background
Youth Choir was part of a group of Christian alternative rock bands, primarily based out of Orange County, California, that got their start under the aegis of Calvary Chapel. Drummer Steve Hindalong originally met bass guitarist Tim Chandler while playing in a jazz combo together at Azusa Pacific University; not long afterward, Chandler introduced Hindalong to lead singer and guitarist Derri Daugherty, who was working as the house engineer for Maranatha! Music's Whitefield Studios. The three began writing music together, which resulted in the song, "It's So Wonderful," later released as part of the What's Shakin compilation of Maranatha! Christian alternative rock bands in 1984. Through Daugherty's connections to Daniel Amos, Chandler met Terry Taylor, and accepted Taylor's request to join that band during the recording of Doppelgänger, so Hindalong and Daugherty recruited Mike Sauerbrey to replace Chandler as bassist. The name "Youth Choir" was originally suggested by Taylor, and the new trio liked the term, as they were fans of Sonic Youth and Choir Invisible. In March 1984, Youth Choir was asked to be part of the initial Cornerstone Festival later that summer; the band quickly pressed up a 7" single of two live tracks, "I Can't Take It," and "Here in the Night," to have something to offer attendees besides the What's Shakin compilation. Youth Choir was later signed to Broken Records, a division of Maranatha!.

Recording and production
Youth Choir returned to Whitefield Studios to record their debut. Derri Daugherty wanted Terry Taylor to produce the record, but Broken recommended producer Thom Roy, who had co-produced ¡Alarma! for Daniel Amos and produced the debut album for the Lifesavors. Of the three songs Youth Choir had previously released, Roy opted only to re-record "Here in the Night" for Voices in Shadows. The remainder of the tracks—and in particular, the lyrics—were primarily written by Daugherty; starting with Shades of Gray, Steve Hindalong would assume almost all lyrical duties from that point forward. Due to budget limitations, the album was recorded at off-peak hours, and Daugherty and Mike Sauerbrey recorded their tracks over a basic drum machine, with the assumption that Hindalong would replace the machine with live drums. Unfortunately, the budget didn't allow for more than cymbal crashes and the sound of a hubcab being thrown across the studio floor during the instrumental break of "Someone's Calling." Roy referred to Youth Choir's early style as the "San Francisco Sound," but the band's influences at this time were primarily British, being described by one critic as "The Cure on Prozac."

Before the album's release, the band convinced the label brass to let them re-record "A Million Years" as a full band, with Mark Heard as producer, Bill Batstone on bass and including newly-hired Dan Michaels on Lyricon, before issuing that single to Christian radio. While in the studio with Heard, Youth Choir also re-recorded "Another World" as well as two new tracks: "We Should Be Dancing," and an early version of "All Night Long," the latter of which would be recorded again for the Shades of Gray EP. The re-recorded versions of "A Million Years" and "All Night Long" would officially be released on the compilation album Love Songs and Prayers: A Retrospective in 1995, with the other two tracks appearing on the "Nevermind the Extras" disc in the Choir's Never Say Never: The First 20 Years boxed set in 2000.

Critical reception

At the time of the album's release, CCM Magazine (during its brief run as the retitled Contemporary Christian Magazine) did not do a formal review of Voices in Shadows, but included a brief overview of the album as part of a special section entitled "New Faces in Music." Writer Scott Pinzon was critical of Youth Choir's first effort, saying the album "lacks variety, so the tunes tend to blend." Including the Imitators’ first EP in his assessment, Pinzon wrote that, "both bands suffer from low budgets, relatively inexperienced producers, and heavy-handed lyrics." Contemporary Christian Magazine′s sister publication Musicline was far more charitable. Reviewer Brian Quincy Newcomb called the "Flock of Seagulls- and Police-influenced" album "a fine debut," saying that the trio of Daugherty, Hindalong and Sauerbrey "have captured a sound that is vital and interesting, while speaking with sincerity and sensitivity."

Retrospective critical reaction has also been more favorable. Mark Allender at AllMusic called Youth Choir's debut a "nice effort" with "creative guitar work," and added that, "on its own merit [...] this release can be disappointing, but taken in the context of [the Choir's] later work, one can get a taste of the seeds that brought out their later successes." In a review of the 2000 CD reissue of Voices in Shadows and Shades of Gray, Michial Farmer at The Phantom Tollbooth said, "while the band’s early material never quite reached the magnitude of such classics as Circle Slide and Speckled Bird, there are quite a few excellent songs," and highlighted "Someone's Calling" as "an excellent minor-key rocker." 
Mike Rimmer at CrossRhythms expressed similar sentiments, saying that "these recordings [are] very much a product of their age," but clarified that the album reflected "the embryonic traits that [made] their later recordings so evocative." Wayne Myatt at Jesus Freak Hideout pointed out similar dichotomies, saying that "some of the songs seem to drag on too much with a chorus that doesn't ease the anticipation of a recovery such as "Another World," "Dreams," and "Why Are All The Children Crying." At the same time, however, the record also contains some truly classic tunes that you will want to play again and again." Myatt praised the lead single "A Million Years" in particular as "a great, timeless ballad." Mark Allan Powell in the Encyclopedia of Contemporary Christian Music agreed, writing that, "the group basically had its trademark sound down from the first album on; [...] the album opens ("Someone's Calling") and closes ("A Million Years") with its best tracks."

Track listing
All songs written by Derri Daugherty, unless otherwise specified.

Personnel 
Youth Choir
 Derri Daugherty – guitars, vocals
 Steve Hindalong – drums, vocals, percussion
 Mike Sauerbrey – bass guitar

Production
 Thom Roy – producer, engineer
 Dave Hackbarth - engineer (live sound)
 Bob Salcedo, Tim Curiel - crew
 Ed McTaggart - design (sleeve)
 Kevin Short - design, layout, illustration (photo)
 Scott Lockwood - photography
 Linda Baley - photography (back cover)

References
Footnotes

Bibliography

External links
 

1985 albums
The Choir (alternative rock band) albums